The New York City Department of Environmental Protection (DEP) is the department of the government of New York City that manages the city's water supply and works to reduce air, noise, and hazardous materials pollution.

DEP is also responsible for managing the city's combined sewer system, which carries both storm water runoff and sanitary waste, and fourteen wastewater treatment plants located throughout the city. DEP carries out federal Clean Water Act rules and regulations, handles hazardous materials emergencies and toxic site remediation, oversees asbestos monitoring and removal, enforces the city's air and noise codes, bills and collects on city water and sewer accounts, and manages citywide water conservation programs. Its regulations are compiled in title 15 of the New York City Rules.

Facilities

Drinking water 

NYCDEP manages three upstate supply systems to provide the city's drinking water: the Croton system, the Catskill system, and the Delaware system.

Wastewater treatment 
The bureau has a staff of 1,900 employees, with a $340 million annual operating budget, and an annual capital budget of $200 million.

Commissioners 
The current commissioner Rohit Aggarwala was appointed by Mayor Eric Adams in January 2022. Other former Commissioners include: 
Frank McArdle (1978–81), Ed Koch 
Joe McGough (1982-86), Ed Koch
Harvey Schultz (1986–89), Ed Koch
Albert Appleton (1990-93), David Dinkins
Marilyn Gelber (1994–96), Rudy Giuliani 
Joel Miele (1996-2002), Rudy Giuliani
Christopher O. Ward (2002–05), Michael Bloomberg
Caswell F. Holloway (2009-2011), Michael Bloomberg
Carter H. Strickland, Jr. (2011-2014), Michael Bloomberg
Emily Lloyd (2014–2016), Bill De Blasio
Vincent Sapienza (2017–2022), Bill De Blasio
Rohit Aggarwala (2022–present), Eric Adams

Violation of federal environmental laws 
The federal government began investigating the DEP in 1998. On August 29, 2001, the DEP pleaded guilty in federal court to criminal violations of the Clean Water Act and the Toxic Substances Control Act, and sentenced to probation. As a condition of probation, the DEP was required to implement an environmental, health and safety compliance program to prevent future environmental law violations and to improve employee safety working conditions.

In 2003, the Office of Environmental, Health and Safety Compliance (EHS) was formed to administer the DEP's comprehensive safety and compliance efforts, which included the EHS Employee Concerns Program.

In 2006, the term of probation was extended and the BWT was included under the federal monitor's oversight following a discharge of untreated sewage into the East River after emergency generators failed to operate during the August 2003 blackout.

On December 25, 2009, probation and federal oversight of the DEP ended.

EHS Programs

Employee Concerns Program 
Facilitates DEP employee reporting of observed environmental violations and unsafe employee conditions.  Helps employees identify and prevent the harassment and intimidation of co-workers engaged in such activities.
- 24/7 confidential employee concerns hotline
- contract management plan to quicken execution of safety-related contracts
- risk management program

Tiered Audit Program 
Rates conditions by priority, enabling the agency to identify and address more than 44,000 specific workplace conditions

Compliance Action Plan 
Ensures DEP follows all federal, state and local environmental, health and safety regulations by developing written policies, conducting training, and by purchasing and distributing safety equipment.

Since 2001, DEP has invested about $160 million in environmental health and safety programs.

OpX Program 

In 2011, the New York City Water Board appointed Veolia Water to partner with DEP in an effort to identify opportunities to make improvements in every aspect of New York City's drinking water, sewage collection, and wastewater treatment operations. Veolia teamed with McKinsey & Company and Arcadis to acquire additional analytical and technical expertise, respectively. The initiative, branded "Operational Excellence (OpX): The Best Always Do Better," is an opportunity for DEP to take employee ideas and best practices from water utilities across the globe to achieve the agency's goal of being the "safest, most productive, cost-effective, and transparent water utility in the nation."

Rather than responding to future financial pressures with budget cuts that might weaken critical services, the OpX initiative makes improvements that will increase the strength of DEP. The OpX program aims to streamline workflows, boost efficiency, and continuously identify opportunities for improvements that will allow DEP to maintain its level of customer service, safety, and productivity while minimizing rate increases for its roughly 836,000 rate-payers. To achieve this, the Commissioner set a goal for OpX to achieve operating benefits of $100–200 million by 2016.

See also
Environmental issues in New York City
New York City Department of Environmental Protection Police
 New York City Office of Administrative Trials and Hearings (OATH), for hearings conducted on summonses for quality of life violations issued by the Department

References

External links
New York City Department of Environmental Protection
 Department of Environmental Protection in the Rules of the City of New York

Environmental Protection
Environmental protection agencies
Public utilities of the United States
Water management authorities in the United States
Water companies of the United States
Environmental agencies of country subdivisions
Environmental agencies in New York City
Environment of New York City
Water infrastructure of New York City
New York City